The Powell River is a 195-mile-long river in the United States that rises in Southwest Virginia and flows southwest into East Tennessee.

The South Fork of the river rises in rural Wise County, Virginia, near the Laurel Grove community northwest of Norton and flows for several miles before the confluence with Roaring Fork in the Kent Junction community. From Kent Junction the river flows until it meets the North Fork of the River near Woodway, Virginia. The North Folk originates near Keokee, Virginia. The river flows past Big Stone Gap, Virginia and then runs nearly the entire length of Lee County, Virginia. It drains approximately 954 square miles (2,471 km2) in both Virginia and Tennessee before reaching its confluence with the Clinch River in the Norris Lake reservoir at the site of the town of Grantsboro.

The Powell River was named for Ambrose Powell who accompanied the exploration party of Dr. Thomas Walker in the mid-18th century.  Legend has it that his name appeared so frequently carved on trees in the valley of this river that later explorers and early pioneers came to call the stream "Powell's River" and the valley "Powell's Valley".

The Powell River was designated by the Environmental Protection Agency (EPA) as the “second most biologically diverse aquatic system in the nation.”  The Powell is under pressure from the effects of mining (including strip mining), logging and associated road-building.

Lincoln Memorial University operates the Powell River Aquatic Research Station, which is located where Tennessee State Route 63 crosses the river at the Brooks Bridge in Claiborne County, Tennessee. The center, which opened in April 2008, allows for on-site research of water quality, flora, fauna and related habitat.

Fishing in the Powell River can be great in some areas; in Wise County the Virginia Department of Wildlife Resources stocks trout in the shallow rushing waters of the Middle Fork of the Powell River under a "delayed harvest" designation.  Once the river gets to Lee County it is home to smallmouth bass, largemouth bass, red eye bass, bluegill, carp, red horses, walleye, sauger and even big musky. A lot of people kayak the river and even wade to fish.

References

See also
 List of Tennessee rivers
 List of Virginia rivers

Rivers of Tennessee
Rivers of Virginia
Rivers of Claiborne County, Tennessee
Rivers of Union County, Tennessee
Rivers of Campbell County, Tennessee
Rivers of Lee County, Virginia
Rivers of Wise County, Virginia